2Spot Communications is a character-design company based in Thailand. 2Spot was founded in 2004 and is the first character studio in Thailand that combines character design, licensing, mobile applications, merchandising, and retail. Kris Nalamlieng, son of former Siam Cement CEO Chumpol NaLamlieng, is the managing director of 2Spot. As of 2010, 2Spot has developed more than 20 characters sets, 1,000+ products, and 3,000+ digital content materials (i.e. mobile wallpapers and screensavers).

2Spot Communications has been featured on numerous television programs including Bangkok Posts PostScript and Thailand's Morning Talk TV.

History2005 First release of 2Spot mobile products with Thailand's major mobile operators2006 Public opening at Thailand Animation Fair2007 Opening of 2Spot Shop at Siam Square in Bangkok
 Exhibit at Tokyo International Anime Fair
 Exhibit at Hong Kong International Licensing Show
 Exhibit at Hong Kong International Stationery Fair2008 Attendance at Hong Kong International Licensing Show
 Opening of 2Spot Shop at Central Rama 3
 Stationary product launch with 7-Eleven2009 Launch of Bloody Bunny Foremost milk at 7-Eleven
 Release of Bloody Bunny, Biscuit and Unsleep Sheep applications for iPhone and Blackberry
 Awarded runner-up prize at SIPA Game Contest 2009 & SIPA Animation Contest 20092010'
 Exhibit at Toy & Comic Expo Asia 2010 (Thailand)
 Exhibit at Singapore Toy Games & Comic Convention (STGCC) 2010
 Launch of P4 Panda Foremost milk at 7-Eleven Thailand

Characters
2Spot has created over 200 characters,. The four most popular ones are Biscuit, Bloody Bunny, P4, and Unsleep Sheep.

2Spot offers a full line of service for licensing partners, including product design, sourcing, packaging design and short animation development. 2Spot is currently exporting digital and promotional licenses in Asia, Europe, and America.

2Spot clients include FlyCell (USA), Kaga Electronics (Japan), ACE Communications (France), Zoobe (Germany), Moffy (HK), and Sony Ericsson (Thailand).

References

External links
 2Spot website

Companies based in Bangkok
Design companies of Thailand
Thai companies established in 2004
Design companies established in 2004